Kolanukonda is a village in Guntur district of the Indian state of Andhra Pradesh. It is located in Tadepalle mandal part of Mangalagiri Tadepalle Municipal Corporation part of Guntur revenue division. It is a suburb of Vijayawada.
There is a historical temple on the hill here. It is a Shiva temple and
kodanda ramalayam and malchaamma Zenda chettu in tanda

Geography 

Demographics 

 Census of India, Kolanukonda had a population of 3,164. The total population constitute, 1,580 males and 1,584 females —a sex ratio of 1003 females per 1000 males. 427 children are in the age group of 0–6 years, of which 205 are boys and 222 are girls —a ratio of 979 per 1000. The average literacy rate stands at 67.96% with 1,860 literates, approximately equal to the state average of 67.41%.

Government and politics 

Kolanukonda gram panchayat is the local self-government of the village. It is divided into wards and each ward is represented by a ward member. The ward members are headed by a Sarpanch. The village forms a part of Andhra Pradesh Capital Region and is under the jurisdiction of APCRDA.

Transport 

Kolanukonda railway station is located on Howrah-Chennai main line and administered under Vijayawada railway division of South Central Railways.

See also 
List of villages in Guntur district

References 

Villages in Guntur district